The 2008 Pacific Life Pacific-10 Conference men's basketball tournament was held between March 12 and March 15, 2008, at Staples Center in Los Angeles. All ten schools in the conference qualified for the tournament. Number one seed UCLA defeated number two seed Stanford 67–64 to win the conference tournament. It was the first time since 2005 that the top two seeded teams were in the final game. UCLA was the regular season champion. A record crowd of 18,997 (Staples Center capacity for Basketball) was on hand to watch UCLA defeat USC 57–54 in the semi finals. On January 3, 2010, USC Athletic Director Mike Garrett announced that the school was to vacate the 2007–08 season's victories for NCAA violations by the basketball team.

Seeds

All Pacific-10 schools played in the tournament. Teams were seeded by conference record, with a tiebreaker system used to seed teams with identical conference records.

Bracket

* Denotes a vacated win, as the result of a January 3, 2010 announcement that USC has vacated all wins during the 2007–2008 season, including its Pac-10 Conference tournament victory over Arizona State (therefore, USC finished the season with a record of 0–12).

All-Tournament Team
O. J. Mayo, USC
Kyle Weaver, Washington State
Brook Lopez, Stanford
Russell Westbrook, UCLA
Kevin Love, UCLA

Most Outstanding Player

Darren Collison, UCLA

Aftermath & notes
 Arch rivals UCLA and USC met for the first time in 225 games in post-season play. The teams had split in the regular season, with the Trojans winning at Pauley Pavilion and the Bruins winning at Galen Center. In their third matchup of the season, a capacity crowd of 18,997 at the Staples Center saw UCLA beat USC 57–54 in the tournament semi-finals. Both teams had highly regarded freshmen: Kevin Love and O. J. Mayo. 
 This was the fourth match up between any arch-rival pairs in Pac-10 history, with only the two Oregon schools yet to meet.
 Arizona set a record for most points in a half (1st) for any Pac-10/12 Tournament game with 59 (vs. OSU (21) on Mar. 12, 2008. 
 Brook Lopez of Stanford had an individual tournament record 60 field goal attempts (25 made in 3 games) which still stands.
 Nine Pacific-10 teams were invited to Post season play. UCLA, Stanford, Washington State, USC, Arizona, and Oregon were invited to the 2008 NCAA Division I men's basketball tournament. UCLA was the number one seed in the West Regional bracket. Arizona State and California were invited to the 2008 National Invitation Tournament. Washington was invited to the 2008 College Basketball Invitational.

References

2007–08 Pac-10 Men's Basketball Media Guide pages 50–60 (PDF copy available at 2007–08 Pac-10 Men's Basketball Media Guide)

Pac-12 Conference men's basketball tournament